Resurrection is an American fantasy drama television series that aired from March 9, 2014, to January 25, 2015, on ABC. It is based on Jason Mott's 2013 novel The Returned, and is centered on a town in which dead people come back to life. It was co-produced by ABC Studios and Plan B Entertainment, led by Brad Pitt, Aaron Zelman, JoAnn Alfano, Jon Liebman, Dede Gardner, Jeremy Kleiner, Michele Fazekas, and Tara Butters.

On May 7, 2015, ABC cancelled the series after two seasons.

Premise
The series follows the residents of Arcadia, Missouri, whose lives are upended when their loved ones return from the dead, unaged since their deaths. Among the returned is Jacob Langston (Landon Gimenez), an eight-year-old boy who drowned in 1982. Having been found alive in China, Jacob is brought back to the United States by an immigration agent named J. Martin ("Marty") Bellamy (Omar Epps), who defies orders and returns Jacob to his parents, Henry (Kurtwood Smith) and Lucille (Frances Fisher). Jacob's surprise return inspires his uncle, Arcadia Sheriff Fred Langston (Matt Craven), and Fred's daughter Dr. Maggie Langston (Devin Kelley), whose wife/mother drowned while allegedly trying to rescue the boy, to learn more about this mystery. Caleb Richards (Sam Hazeldine), the father of Maggie's best friend Elaine Richards (Samaire Armstrong), becomes the second Arcadia resident to return, and he warns that there are many more to follow.

Cast and characters

Main
 Omar Epps as Immigration and Customs Agent J. Martin "Marty" Bellamy/Robert Thompson
 Frances Fisher as Lucille Langston
 Matt Craven as Sheriff Fred Langston
 Devin Kelley as Dr. Maggie Langston
 Mark Hildreth as Pastor Thomas "Tom" Hale
 Samaire Armstrong as Elaine Richards
 Sam Hazeldine as Caleb Richards (main; season 1, recurring; season 2)
 Landon Gimenez as Jacob Langston
 Kurtwood Smith as Henry Langston

Recurring
 Kathleen Munroe as Rachael Braidwood
 Kevin Sizemore as Gary Humphrey
 James Tupper as Dr. Eric Ward
 Tamlyn Tomita as Dr. Toni Willis
 Travis Young as Ray Richards
 Veronica Cartwright as Helen Edgerton
 Lori Beth Sikes as Janine Hale
 April Billingsley as Barbara Langston
 Ned Bellamy as Sam Catlin
 Jwaundace Candece as Mrs. Camille Thompson
 Shawn Shepard as Mr. Wallace Thompson
 Nadej Bailey as Jenny Thompson
 Christopher Berry as Deputy Carl Enders
 Glenn Fleshler as Mikey Enders (season 2)
 Michelle Fairley as Margaret Langston (season 2)
 Donna Murphy as Elegant Woman/Angela Forrester (season 2)
 Kyle Secor as Brian Addison (season 2)
 T.J. Linnard as William Kirk (season 2)
 Jim Parrack as Preacher James Goodman (season 2)

Episodes

Season 1 (2014)

Season 2 (2014–15)

Development and production
In January 2013, ABC ordered the project to pilot status and in March brought in Charles McDougall as director as part of a two-year deal he signed with ABC Studios. On March 7, 2013, ABC released its list of potential hour-long pilot pick-ups, with the title changed to Forever. The title changed again after ABC ordered it to series in May 2013.

On May 7, 2015, ABC announced that it had cancelled Resurrection after two seasons. The network cited low ratings as the reason for its cancellation. It was high-rated in its first season, but saw a big drop in ratings in its second season. Resurrection produced by ABC Studios was one of the biggest cancellations for ABC along with two other shows Cristela and the Ioan Gruffudd drama Forever.

Reception

Critical response
Resurrection scored 60 out of 100 on Metacritic based on 29 reviews, indicating a "mixed or average" response. Rotten Tomatoes gave it a 52% rating with an average rating of 5.7 out of 10, based on 33 reviews.

Ratings

Overall

Season 1

Season 2

Broadcast
In Australia, the series premiered on March 25, 2014, on Seven Network. Its debut episode was the highest rating series premiere for two years in Australia, attracting an audience of 1.9 million mainland capital city viewers (beating previous record holder Revenge whose first episode reached 2.06 million viewers in 2012) and 2.82 million viewers nationally. It also topped all three key advertising demographics. The second season premiered on February 22, 2015, at the new time of 10:30 p.m. every Sunday. The second season premiered to 112,000 in a new time slot and consequently was the lowest ratings for the series. In New Zealand, it premiered on July 16, 2014, on TV2.

In Canada, the series was simsubbed on Citytv for the first season and CTV for subsequent seasons.

In Ireland, the series debuted in summer 2014 on RTÉ Two. In the United Kingdom, the show began airing on pay-TV channel, Watch on August 18, 2014. The second season premiered on March 19, 2015.

Home media release
ABC and Walt Disney Studios Home Entertainment scheduled the release of the first season of Resurrection in DVD format for June 10, 2014. The two-disc set features all eight episodes and bonus features, such as "On Location in Georgia", "Resurrection: Building a Mystery", bloopers, and deleted scenes.

See also
They Came Back, a 2004 film with a similar premise
Les Revenants, a 2012 French TV series with a similar premise
The Returned, a 2015 American TV adaptation of Les Revenants
Glitch, a 2015 Australian TV series with a similar premise

References

External links
 
 

2010s American drama television series
2014 American television series debuts
2015 American television series endings
American Broadcasting Company original programming
American fantasy television series
2010s American science fiction television series
2010s American supernatural television series
English-language television shows
Serial drama television series
Television shows based on American novels
Television series by ABC Studios
Television shows filmed in Georgia (U.S. state)
Television shows set in Missouri
Fiction about resurrection
American fantasy drama television series